River climbing, river trekking, river tracing or mountain stream climbing is a form of hiking or outdoor adventure activity, a traditional sport in Japan and popular in Hong Kong and Taiwan, and, in some ways, similar to canyoning or canyoneering. River trekking is a combination of trekking and climbing and sometimes swimming along the river. It involves particular techniques like rock climbing, climbing on wet surfaces, understanding the geographical features of river and valleys, knotting, dealing with sudden bad weather and finding out possible exits from the river.

In different countries

Japan

Japan and Taiwan are the most popular destinations for this sport.

The most famous 100 mountain streams to climb in Japan can be found by looking up 百名谷.

Taiwan

This sport is popular throughout Taiwan, where it is generally called river tracing (溯溪). The Hualien and Yilan areas are the most popular destinations for river tracing.

River tracing is a popular activity among the people of Taiwan. Accomplished river tracers may start from the mouth of a river. Several wilderness survival skills are needed, such as rock climbing, swimming and camping. However, there are different levels of difficulty, so beginners can take part. For beginners, it is advisable to choose an easier and more relaxed route, which can be completed in half a day. With safety equipment and an experienced coach, a participant can gradually master the skills needed to walk upstream. Sometimes it is necessary to swim through deep pools or climb up waterfalls. With a life vest, a non-swimmer can river trace as well.

Hong Kong

Nine Big Rivers

The Nine Big Rivers (九大石澗) are the nine streams that are most popular among river trekkers in Hong Kong. The Nine Big Rivers include:

Philippines

In the Philippines, river trekking is just gaining its popularity especially with the introduction of Mapawa Nature Park in Cagayan de Oro in Mindanao on one of their must-do activities. There are five challenges in the river which includes swimming, rappelling, jumping and sliding among others.

The particular nature park was featured on GMA 7's now defunct reality show Extra Challenge.

South Africa

The South African version of river trekking is called kloofing and has gained a similar following from both an informal recreational and commercial point of view.

Rating of difficulties

As river trekking has a certain level of risk, experienced river trekkers or hiking groups have developed rating systems about difficulties on different rivers. The ratings usually are various from 1 to 5 stars, even though a few rivers can be more than five stars because of their extreme difficulties. Such ratings are largely subjective, depending largely on river trekker's own experience. Therefore, different people or hiking groups would give different number of stars on the same river. According to Hong Kong Adventurer, an English Website about hiking and river trekking in Hong Kong, difficult scale of different rivers as:

Risks and dangers

River trekking has a certain level of risk. There are occasional accidents in river trekking, including falls from steep cliffs or waterfalls, drownings, exhaustion, or getting lost. Risks that should be prepared for include the following:

Flash flooding poses a serious danger. Sudden changes in weather, like rainstorms, can cause rapid rises in the level and speed of the river water. Also, the number of viable paths and climbing areas inside the river valley could be reduced suddenly in a very short period.

Visibility can be limited by rainy or misty weather. Low visibility may come in too quickly for trekkers to adapt to. Therefore, a torch (flashlight), preferably a head-mounted one, is a must for river trekking.

Steep cliffs inside river valleys require a certain level of rock-climbing skills. However, because of the humid environment inside river valleys, some rock surfaces can be wet and some rocks may be loose despite appearing solid. To deal with wet climbing conditions, professional river-trekking boots are strongly advised.

See also

Canyoning
Hiking
Kloofing
Geography of Hong Kong
Country parks and conservation in Hong Kong
Environment of Hong Kong

References and external links

Sport in Hong Kong

ja:沢登り
zh:溯溪